Mourade Zeguendi (born 30 October 1980 in Saint-Josse-ten-Noode) is a Belgian-Moroccan actor.

Career 
Zeguendi began his career in theatre, founding Union Suspecte, an independent theatre group, alongside Chokri and Zouzou Ben Chikha in 2003.

In 2017, he turned down a role in a Brian De Palma film after the director offered him a role as a Molenbeek terrorist.

Partial filmography

Film 

 2005: Dikkenek
 2006: Taxi 4
 2007: Go Fast
 2008: JCVD
 2008: Barons
 2011: I Will Survive
 2011: L'amante du Rif
 2014: Plan Bart
 2015: Certified Halal
 2015: Timgad

Television 

 2019: Sawah
 2020: Undercover

External links

References 

Living people
1980 births